Guillermo Aníbal Saavedra (born October 7, 1960) is an Argentine poet, editor and journalist.

He is editor of the literary supplements of newspapers La Razón and Clarin, and correspondent of the cultural supplement of El País de Montevideo.

Awards
 2001 Guggenheim Fellowship grant.

Works
 Caracol Ediciones Ultimo Reino, 1989, 
 Tentativas sobre Cage (La Marca, 1995) 
 El velador (Bajo La Luna Nueva, 1998)
 La voz inútil: poemas (1980–2003), Bajo la luna, 2003,

Poetry books for children 
 Pancitas argentinas (Alfaguara, 2000) 
 Cenicienta no escarmienta (Alfaguara, 2003)

Interviews with Argentine writers
 La curiosidad impertinente (Beatriz Viterbo, 1993)

Anthologies 
 Cuentos de historia argentina (Alfaguara, 1998)
 La pena del aire (poemas de Ricardo E. Molinari) (Mondadori, 2000)
 Cuentos escogidos de Andrés Rivera (Alfaguara, 2000)
 Mi cuento favorito (Alfaguara, 2000)
 Cuentos de escritoras argentinas Alfaguara, 2001, 
 El placer rebelde: antología general, Fondo de Cultura Económica, 2003, 
 four anthologies included in the series Vamos a leer published by the Argentine Secretary of Culture (2001).

References

External links
"GUILLERMO SAAVEDRA", Videoteca Literaria Independiente 22 June 2008
Babel. Revista de libros. Complete online collection in Ahira, Archivo Histórico de Revistas Argentinas (free download).

1960 births
Argentine journalists
Male journalists
20th-century Argentine poets
20th-century Argentine male writers
Argentine male poets
Living people
People from Buenos Aires
21st-century Argentine poets
21st-century Argentine male writers